Egil Austbø (born 12 January 1947) is a Norwegian footballer. He played in three matches for the Norway national football team from 1969 to 1974.

References

External links
 

1947 births
Living people
Norwegian footballers
Norway international footballers
Place of birth missing (living people)
Association football forwards
SK Brann players
Norwegian football managers
SK Brann managers